The Boxing Association of Korea (BAK) is an affiliated organization of the Korean Olympic Committee. Its mission is the development and dissemination of amateur boxing in South Korea. BAK was founded in 1934 under the name of the Chosun Amateur Boxing Association.

External links
South Korea suspended by world boxing federation
 S. Korean boxing governing body regains int'l membership

References

National members of the Asian Boxing Confederation
Sports organizations of South Korea
Amateur boxing organizations